= Cemochechobee Creek =

Stream in Georgia, U.S.

Coordinates: 31°37′03″N 85°03′22″W

Cemochechobee Creek is a stream in the U.S. state of Georgia. It is a tributary to the Chattahoochee River.

Cemochechobee is a name derived from the Muskogean language meaning "sand-big". Variant names include "Cemocheckobee Creek", "Cemocheechobee Creek", "Cemocheehobbee Creek", "Comochechabbee Creek", and "Comochechebbee Creek".
